Claire Victoria Williams  (born 21 July 1976) is a British former motorsport executive who was the deputy team principal of the Williams Formula One racing team from 2013 to 2020.

Early life
Claire Williams was born in 1976 in Windsor, Berkshire. She is the daughter of Sir Frank Williams and Virginia Williams. She graduated from Newcastle University in 1999 with a degree in politics.

Career
After graduation, Williams became a press officer for the Silverstone racing circuit. In 2002, she joined the Williams F1 team as a communications officer. In 2010, she became the head of communications for the team. In 2011, she was promoted to director of marketing and communications for Williams. When Frank Williams stepped down from the Williams board in March 2012, Claire became the Williams family representative on the board.
In March 2013, she was appointed deputy team principal of the Williams F1 racing team. In this role she retained responsibility for marketing, communications and the commercial aspects of the team's business.

Williams was appointed Officer of the Order of the British Empire (OBE) in the 2016 Birthday Honours for services to Formula 1 racing.

On 3 September 2020, Williams announced she was resigning as deputy team principal of the Williams team on 7 September 2020 after the 2020 Italian Grand Prix. Before the race, at the Williams motorhome, she was given the front wing of a Williams FW36 as a souvenir.

Personal life
On 5 April 2017, Williams announced that she was pregnant with her first child, a boy. She gave birth to her son in October 2017.

In January 2018, Williams announced her marriage to Marc Harris.

References

1976 births
Living people
Alumni of Newcastle University
English motorsport people
Formula One team owners
Formula One team principals
Williams Grand Prix Engineering
Officers of the Order of the British Empire
People from Windsor, Berkshire